Dr. Bharati Hemant Lavekar is an Indian politician and member of the Shiv Sangram. She is a first term member of the Maharashtra Legislative Assembly and filed her nomination as a Bharatiya Janata Party candidate.

Constituency
Lavekar was elected from the Versova assembly constituency. She won against three term member of the Maharashtra Legislative Assembly Baldev Khosa from the Indian National Congress.

Positions held 
Maharashtra Legislative Assembly MLA.
Terms in office: 2014–2019.

References 

Bharatiya Janata Party politicians from Maharashtra
Maharashtra MLAs 2014–2019
Living people
Shiv Sangram politicians
Maharashtra politicians
Year of birth missing (living people)